Tevenvirinae is a subfamily of viruses in the order Caudovirales, in the family Myoviridae. Bacteria and archaea serve as natural hosts. There are 135 species in this subfamily, most included in 12 genera.

Taxonomy
The following genera are recognized:
 Dhakavirus
 Gaprivervirus
 Gelderlandvirus
 Jiaodavirus
 Karamvirus
 Krischvirus
 Moonvirus
 Mosigvirus
 Pseudotevenvirus
 Schizotequatrovirus
 Slopekvirus
 Tequatrovirus

The following species are unassigned to a genus:
 Acinetobacter virus 133
 Aeromonas virus Aeh1

Structure

Viruses in Tevenvirinae are non-enveloped, with head-tail geometries. These viruses are about 70 nm wide and 140 nm long. Genomes are linear, around 170-245kb in length. The genome codes for 300 to 415 proteins.

Life cycle
Viral replication is cytoplasmic. Entry into the host cell is achieved by adsorption into the host cell. DNA-templated transcription is the method of transcription. The virus exits the host cell by lysis, and holin/endolysin/spanin proteins. Bacteria and archaea serve as the natural host. Transmission routes are passive diffusion.

References

External links
 Viralzone: Tevenvirinae
 ICTV

 
Myoviridae
Virus subfamilies